Flute Flight is an album by American  and Belgian jazz flautists Herbie Mann and Bobby Jaspar featuring tracks recorded in 1957 for the Prestige label.

Reception

Allmusic reviewer Alex Henderson stated: "Anyone who complains that jazz hasn't had enough flute playing over the years will want to add Flute Flight to his/her collection". The Penguin Guide to Jazz Recordings describes the album as making “a substantial contribution to the evolution of jazz flute.”

Track listing
 "Tutti Flutie" (Herbie Mann) - 10:10    
 "Bo-Do" (Joe Puma) - 5:54    
 "Flute Bass Blues" (Doug Watkins) - 7:23    
 "Flute Bob" (Bobby Jaspar) - 7:03    
 "Solacium" (Tommy Flanagan) - 5:51  
Recorded at Van Gelder Studio in Hackensack, New Jersey on March 12 (tracks 3–5) and March 21 (tracks 1 & 2), 1957

Personnel 
Herbie Mann - flute (tracks 1 & 2), Bobby Jaspar - flute (tracks 1–5)
Tommy Flanagan - piano (tracks 1–5)
Eddie Costa - vibraphone (tracks 3–5)
Joe Puma - guitar (tracks 1 & 2)
Wendell Marshall (tracks 1 & 2), Doug Watkins (tracks 3–5),- bass
Bobby Donaldson - drums

References 

1957 albums
Herbie Mann albums
Bobby Jaspar albums
Albums produced by Ozzie Cadena
Prestige Records albums